Heterormista is a genus of moths of the family Erebidae. The genus was erected by Charles Swinhoe in 1901.

Species
Heterormista fulvitaenia (Warren, 1903) New Guinea
Heterormista modesta C. Swinhoe, 1901 Queensland, New Guinea
Heterormista psammochroa (Lower, 1903) Queensland

References

Calpinae
Noctuoidea genera